Valkama is a surname. Notable people with the surname include:

 Aarne Valkama, Finnish Nordic combined skier
 Erik Valkama, member of the Finnish band Dingo
 Jorma Valkama (born 1928), Finnish athlete
 Juha Valkama (born 1979), Finnish ice dancer
 Reino Valkama (1906-1962), Finnish actor
 Yrjö Valkama (1894-1975), Finnish diver

Finnish-language surnames
Surnames of Finnish origin